Apocalypse Whenever is the fourth studio album by indie rock band Bad Suns, released on Epitaph Records on January 28, 2022. it is their first album since 2019's album: Mystic Truth (2019)

On September 28, 2020, Bad Suns released the first single, "Baby Blue Shades." The single was produced by Eric Palmquist, who worked with the band on their first two albums, Language & Perspective and Disappear Here. The band released their second single, "Heaven is a Place in My Head" on May 31, 2021. On September 21, 2021, they announced the title and release date, as well as released the single "When The World Was Mine." They released the singles "Wishing Fountains," "Peachy," and "Life Was Easier When I Only Cared About Me," ahead of the album's release. On January 28, 2022, the album was released and the band started their tour of the same name.

Reception
Steve Beebee of Kerrang gave Apocalypse Whenever a three out of five for having "deft songs, interesting and memorable hooks, plus lots of little melodic pay-offs that you don’t necessarily appreciate until a second or third play", but concedes that the music is not great.

Track listing
Songs written by Christo Bowman
Music written by Christo Bowman, Gavin Bennett, Miles Morris, And Ray Libby
“Baby Blue Shades", "Peachy”, “ When the World Was Mine”, “Grace (I Think I'm in Love Again)” Written By Christo Bowman, Gavin Bennett, Miles Morris, Ray Libby, and Eric Palmquist
“Heaven Is a Place in My Head“ written by Christo Bowman, Gavin Bennett, Miles Morris, Ray Libby, Nick Long, and Eric Palmquist
"Life Was Easier When I Only Cared About Me” written by  Christo Bowman, Gavin Bennett, Miles Morris, Ray Libby, Sierra Deaton, and Eric Palmquist

"Apocalypse Whenever" – 3:38
"Summer Lightning" – 3:34
"Baby Blue Shades" – 3:40
"Peachy" – 3:22
"When the World Was Mine" – 3:30
"Wishing Fountains" – 3:35
"Electric Circus" – 3:24
"Nightclub (Waiting for You)" – 3:46
"Life Was Easier When I Only Cared About Me" – 3:51
"Heaven Is a Place In My Head" – 3:51
"Silently Screaming" – 3:42
"Grace (I Think I’m in Love Again)" – 3:34
"Symphony of Lights" – 4:19

Personnel
Bad Suns
Christo Bowman – vocals, guitar, keys, synths, vibraphone
Gavin Bennett – bass guitar, keys, synths, backing vocals
Miles Morris – drums, percussion, backing vocals
Ray Libby – guitar, keys, backing vocals, shakers, bass guitar on "Electric Circus"

Production Personnel
Eric Palmquist – production
Mike Crossey – mixing
Chris Geher – mastering
Steven Aguilar, Cameron Rochte, Jake Munk – assistant engineering

Additional Musicians
Strings on "Wishing Fountains" arranged by Nathaniel Walcott
Cello on "Wishing Fountains" by Vanessa Freebairn-Smith
Violin, Viola on "Wishing Fountains" by Paul Cartwright 
Saxophone on "Silently Screaming" by John Waugh 
Background Vocals on "Summer Lightning", "Peachy", And "Electric Circus" by Stephanie Williams 
Background Vocals on "Electric Circus" by Svea Palmquist

Art and Album Personnel
Art direction by Christo Bowman
Photography by Lupe Bustos
Layout and design by Kamtin Mohager
Title font by Ray Libby 
Management by Bryan Ling at New Community Management

References

External links
Page from Bad Suns' site

2022 albums
Bad Suns albums
Epitaph Records albums